Michael John Clyde Ronaldson (born 13 February 1954) is a former Australian politician. He was a Senator for the state of Victoria representing the Liberal Party from July 2005 until February 2016, and previously served in the House of Representatives for Ballarat from 1990 to 2001. Ronaldson served as the Minister for Veterans' Affairs, the Minister Assisting the Prime Minister for the Centenary of ANZAC, and the Special Minister of State in the Abbott Government from 2013 to 2015.

Background and early career
Ronaldson was born in Ballarat, Victoria and attended Ballarat College before studying law at the University of Melbourne.  Admitted to the Bar, Ronaldson practised as a barrister and solicitor in Ballarat before entering politics. In 1981, Ronaldson was elected to the Ballarat City Council, where he served two terms as a councillor.

Political career

A member of the Liberal Party since 1980, Ronaldson was elected to the House of Representatives for the seat of Ballarat in 1990.

His election, along with several other Victorian MHRs first elected in March 1990, was largely a result of a protest vote swing against the Labor (John Cain) state government of the time. At his election, he held the seat with a margin of 1.9%.

His grandfather, Archibald Fisken, was the member for Ballarat from 1934 until 1937. During his time in the House of Representatives, Ronaldson served as the Shadow Minister for Youth, Sport and Recreation, Shadow Parliamentary Secretary to the Leader of the Opposition and Shadow Minister for Schools, Vocational Education and Training.

Following the election of the Howard government at the 1996 federal election, Ronaldson was appointed as a Parliamentary Secretary to the Minister for Transport and Regional Development. After the 1998 election he was appointed Chief Government Whip.

Following his retirement from the House of Representatives at the 2001 election, Ronaldson was a consultant and member of a number of boards including Snowy Hydro Limited. He was co-chair of the Australian Ex-Prisoners of War Memorial project in Ballarat where he assisted with fundraising. He served on the Administrative Committee of the Liberal Party of Australia (Victorian Division) from 2001 to 2004. Ronaldson has been a member of the Liberal Party for more than 30 years.

Senator for Victoria
At the 2004 federal election Ronaldson was elected to the Senate representing the state of Victoria, and his term began on 1 July 2005. Following the 2007 election, Ronaldson was appointed as Shadow Special Minister of State under Brendan Nelson. He served as Shadow Cabinet Secretary in September 2008 until December 2009.

After the 2010 federal election Ronaldson was appointed Shadow Minister for Veterans' Affairs and Shadow Minister Assisting the Leader of the Opposition on the Centenary of ANZAC.

He assumed the portfolios as Minister for Veterans' Affairs, Minister Assisting the Prime Minister for the Centenary of ANZAC and Special Minister of State on 18 September 2013, but was replaced in the First Turnbull Ministry when Malcolm Turnbull replaced Tony Abbott as prime minister.

He announced on 18 December 2015 his intention to leave parliament before the next election, after moving from the outer ministry in the Abbott Government to the backbench in the Turnbull Government. He said he would formally resign from parliament once his Liberal replacement was selected. His resignation became effective on 28 February 2016, creating a casual vacancy which was filled on 9 March 2016 when James Paterson was appointed by a joint sitting of the Parliament of Victoria.

Personal life
Ronaldson has been married to Cate Ronaldson since 1983, and has three children.

He survived a bout with kidney cancer in 1996.

References

External links
 Summary of parliamentary voting for Senator Michael Ronaldson on TheyVoteForYou.org.au

1954 births
Living people
Abbott Government
Turnbull Government
Liberal Party of Australia members of the Parliament of Australia
Members of the Australian House of Representatives
Members of the Australian House of Representatives for Ballarat
Members of the Australian Senate
Members of the Australian Senate for Victoria
Melbourne Law School alumni
Government ministers of Australia
Australian barristers
Victoria (Australia) local councillors
People from Ballarat
21st-century Australian politicians
20th-century Australian politicians